Nosphistica fuscolepis is a moth in the family Lecithoceridae which is endemic to Taiwan.

References

External links

Moths described in 2002
Endemic fauna of Taiwan
Moths of Taiwan
Nosphistica